Lauwe may refer to:
Lauwe, name until 1941 of the rural locality of Yablonovka in Saratov Oblast, Russia
Lauwe (Belgium), former municipality and currently a borough of the city of Menen, Belgium